Janet Remixed (stylized as janet. Remixed) is the second remix album by American singer Janet Jackson. Released on March 13, 1995, it featured two non-album B-sides, including the radio hit "And On and On" and "70's Love Groove", as well as a number of exclusive remixes of tracks from the Janet album. The rare B-side to the single "If", "One More Chance", was not included on the CD version of Janet Remixed but on vinyl and cassette versions. However, like 1987's Control: The Remixes, it was never given a commercial release in Jackson's native United States.

Track listing

Personnel

 Jeff Bender – photography
 Brothers in Rhythm – production, remixing (track 2)
 Terry Burrus – piano (track 3)
 Steve Burton – keyboards (track 7)
 Peter Daou – keyboards (track 3)
 Dave Darlington – remix (track 1)
 Marius De Vries – programming (track 8)
 Patrick Demarchelier – photography
 Tom Dolan – design
 E-Smoove – production, remixing (track 6)
 René Elizondo Jr. – photography
 Flea – engineering (track 10)
 Kenny "Dope" Gonzales – drums (track 1)
 Jossie Harris – vocals (track 5)
 Steve Hodge – mixing
 Nellee Hooper – production, remixing (track 8)
 Janet Jackson – production (tracks 1–3, 5–8, 10, 11)
 Jimmy Jam – production (tracks 1–9, 11)
 Sandy Jenkins – engineering assistance (track 1)
 Jellybean Johnson – production (track 10)
 R. Kelly – production, remixing (track 11)
 Frankie Knuckles – remixing (track 3)
 Tina Landon – vocals (track 5)
 Terry Lewis – production (tracks 1–9, 11)

 Richard Lowe – remix engineering (Track 7)
 CJ Mackintosh – drums, keyboards, remixing (tracks 1, 7)
 MC Lyte – rapping (track 6)
 Peter Mokran – engineering (track 11)
 David Morales – percussion, remixing (tracks 3, 5)
 Dave Navarro – engineering, lead guitar (track 10)
 Len Peltier – art direction
 John Poppo – engineer (track 3)
 Dave Rideau – mixing (tracks 1–3, 5–11)
 Herb Ritts – photography
 Alan Sanderson – engineering (track 10)
 David Schiffman – remix engineering (track 10)
 Peter "Ski" Schwartz – keyboards (track 5)
 Paul Shapiro – saxophone (track 5)
 Chad Smith – engineering (track 10)
 Lem Springsteen – keyboards (track 5)
 Al Stone – engineering (track 8)
 David Sussman – engineering (track 5)
 Dom T. – additional keyboards (track 8)
 Satoshi Tomiie – keyboards (tracks 3, 5)
 "Little" Louie Vega – keyboards (track 1)
 Ellen von Unwerth – photography
 Danny Weatherspoon – keyboards (track 6)
 Steve Weeder – engineering (track 6)
 Paul Wright – engineering (track 2)

Charts

References

1995 remix albums
Albums produced by Jimmy Jam and Terry Lewis
Albums produced by Nellee Hooper
Albums produced by R. Kelly
Janet Jackson remix albums
Virgin Records remix albums
House music remix albums